The 1937–38 Northern Football League season was the 45th in the history of the Northern Football League, a football competition in Northern England.

Clubs

The league featured 13 clubs which competed in the last season, along with one new club:
 Billingham South

League table

References

1937-38
4